Stan Rose (born February 2, 1956) is an American biologist, biotechnology executive, and entrepreneur. Born in the Bronx, New York, and raised in Greenburg, New York. Rose earned his B.A. from Cornell University in 1978 and his Ph.D. from the Massachusetts Institute of Technology in 1985.

In his professional career, Rose works with scientists and clinicians to commercialize inventions related to genome analysis. He has raised more than $100 million in funding for early stage companies that have gone on to create more than $1 billion in shareholder value. Since 2008, he has served as President of Rose Ventures, an advisory and investment firm that works with early stage companies which develops innovative, high-impact life science products and services.

In April 2021, Rose served as Executive Chairman of Eurofins-TGI following the 2019 acquisition of Transplant Genomics Inc. (TGI) by Eurofins Scientific SE (ERF.PA). Rose was co-founder, director and CEO of TGI, a molecular diagnostics company commercializing tests to help physicians better assess adequacy of immunosuppression for organ transplant recipients, and thereby improve outcomes.

Rose serves as Director at the following companies:
 Invenra, a biotechnology company that develops platforms for new drug discovery, with an initial focus on multi-specific antibodies for immuno-oncology.
 Xeno Biosciences, a company developing transformational medicines for patients suffering from obesity and related diseases. 
 SerumDPT Bioscience, a medical device firm that has created the first device enabling real-time isolation of plasma or serum from drawn blood,

Rose is a Senior Fellow with the Council on Strategic Risks, participating in The Alliance to End Biological Threats.

Rose was a Director of Cellular Dynamics International, a leader in pluripotent stem cell technology for drug discovery and cell therapy acquired by FujiFilm in 2015, and Chair of the Market Advisory Board of Cyvek, a protein immunoassay and immunodiagnostics company acquired by Bio-Techne in 2014.

In his early career, he was CEO of NimbleGen Systems, Inc., a genomics tool company, from 2003 through its acquisition by Roche in 2007; co-founded and growing Genetic MicroSystems, a microarray instrumentation company that was acquired by Affymetrix in 2000; and directed the PCR business for Perkin-Elmer and Applied Biosystems during its most dynamic growth phase in the 1990s.

References

 Microarray Sequence Capture Speeds Large-Scale Resequencing Of Targeted Genomic Regions

American businesspeople
Living people
1956 births
Cornell University alumni
Massachusetts Institute of Technology alumni
Biotechnologists